Christmas Portrait is the first Christmas album and ninth studio album by the American popular music duo Carpenters, released on October 13, 1978.

Background
The album includes a revised version of the duo's signature Christmas song, "Merry Christmas Darling", featuring re-recorded vocals by Karen Carpenter (done at her request). It also includes one of two versions of "Santa Claus Is Comin' to Town" (a slower version, recorded in 1974, as well as other unused songs recorded during this album's sessions, were issued on the Carpenters' later Christmas album, An Old-Fashioned Christmas).

Album artwork
The original album cover by Robert Tanenbaum is modeled on Norman Rockwell's 1960 painting "Triple Self-Portrait", done as a cover for The Saturday Evening Post.

CD reissues
The standard CD version of Christmas Portrait, first issued in 1984, is a "Special Edition" compendium of selected tracks from the Carpenters' two Christmas albums into one 70-minute program, with tracks from each interspersed in the running order; "Ave Maria" was remixed at this time in order to include a choral track that vanished in 1978 and was later found. A CD of the original LP content was briefly issued exclusively in West Germany around the same time.

In 1996, a two-CD set titled Christmas Collection was issued internationally, containing Christmas Portrait and An Old-Fashioned Christmas together with their original respective track listings.

Commercial performance
On April 16, 1998, Christmas Portrait was certified Platinum by the RIAA for shipment of one million copies in the United States since its 1978 release.

In December 2011, Christmas Portrait: Special Edition re-entered the Billboard 200 album sales chart at No. 150 and eventually achieved a new chart peak position of No. 126. In December 2012 and then, in December 2013, the album again re-entered the Billboard 200 album sales chart and attained a new chart peak position of No. 114. In January 2019, it reached a new peak position of No. 67 on the Billboard 200. The original Christmas Portrait has not been available on its own in the US since the late-90's, when the cassette version was discontinued, so the chart action in the 2010s is for the 1984 compilation. In January 2020, it reached another new peak position of No. 56 on the Billboard 200.

By the end of November 2014, Christmas Portrait was the twenty-third best-selling Christmas/holiday album in the U.S. during the SoundScan era of music sales tracking (March 1991 to present), having sold 1,950,000 copies according to SoundScan.

Track listing
All lead vocals by Karen Carpenter, except where noted.

Notes
 signifies adapted by

Singles

"Merry Christmas Darling"
US 7" single (1970) – A&M 1236
"Merry Christmas Darling"
"Mr. Guder"

UK 7" single (1971) – AME601
"Merry Christmas Darling"
"Ticket to Ride"
"Saturday"

UK 7" single (1990) – AM716
"Merry Christmas Darling"
"(They Long to Be) Close to You"

UK 7" single (1990) – AMS716
"Merry Christmas Darling"
"(They Long to Be) Close to You"

UK 12" single (1990) – AMY716
"Merry Christmas Darling"
"You're the One"
"(They Long to Be) Close to You"

UK CD single (1990) – AMCD716
"Merry Christmas Darling"
"(They Long to Be) Close to You"
"You're the One"

"Christmas Song"
US 7" single (1977) – A&M 1991
"Christmas Song"
"Merry Christmas Darling"

JP 7" single (1977) – CM-2083
"Christmas Song"
"Merry Christmas Darling"

JP CD single (1996) – PODM-1059
"Christmas Song"
"Winter Wonderland/Silver Bells/White Christmas"

"Silent Night"
JP 7" single (1978) – AMP 1012
"Silent Night"
"Jingle Bells"
"Ave Maria"

"Ave Maria"
JP CD single (1996) – PODM-1065
"Ave Maria"
"Merry Christmas Darling"

Charts

References

External links
 Richard Carpenter's review
 1978 album at the Carpenters Recording Resource
 1984 Special Edition at Carpenters Recording Resource

1978 Christmas albums
Christmas albums by American artists
The Carpenters albums
A&M Records albums
Pop Christmas albums